The ethnonym Afghan has been used historically to refer to members of the Pashtuns. However, since the second half of the twentieth century, the term "Afghan" officially evolved into that of a demonym for all residents of Afghanistan, including those outside of the Pashtun ethnicity.

Mentions 
The earliest mention of the name Afghan (Abgân) is by Shapur I of the Sassanid Empire during the 3rd century CE, In the 4th century the word "Afghans/Afghana" (αβγανανο) as a reference to a particular people is mentioned in the Bactrian documents found in Northern Afghanistan.

The name Afghan is later recorded in the 6th century CE in the form of "Avagāṇa" [अवगाण] by the Indian astronomer Varāha Mihira in his Brihat-samhita.

The word Afghan has also appeared in the 982 Ḥudūd al-ʿĀlam, where a reference is made to a village, Saul, which was probably located near Gardez, in the Paktia province of Afghanistan. 

Hudud ul-'alam also speaks of a king in Ninhar (Nangarhar), who had Muslim, Afghan and Hindu wives. 

In the 11th century, Afghans are mentioned in Al-Biruni's Tarikh-ul Hind ("History of the Indus"), which describes groups of rebellious Afghans in the tribal lands west of the Indus River in what is today Pakistan. 

Al-Utbi, the Ghaznavid chronicler, in his Tarikh-i Yamini records that many Afghans and Khiljis (possibly the modern Ghilji) enlisted in the army of Sabuktigin after Jayapala was defeated.

Al-Utbi further states that Afghans and Ghiljis made a part of Mahmud Ghaznavi's army and were sent on his expedition to Tocharistan, while on another occasion Mahmud Ghaznavi attacked and punished a group of opposing Afghans, as also corroborated by Abulfazl Beyhaqi.  It is recorded that Afghans were also enrolled in the Ghurid Kingdom (1148–1215). By the beginning of the Khilji dynasty in 1290, Afghans have been well known in northern India.

Ibn Battuta, a famous Moroccan traveler, visiting Afghanistan following the era of the Khilji dynasty in 1333 writes.A 16th-century Muslim historian writing about the history of Muslim rule in the subcontinent states:

Etymology
Some scholars suggest that the word "Afghan" is derived from the words awajan/apajan in Avestan and ava-Han/apa-Han in Sanskrit, which means "killing, striking, throwing and resisting, or defending." Under the Sasanians, and possibly the Parthian Empire, the word was used to refer to men of a certain Persian sect.

The etymological view supported by numerous noted scholars is that the name Afghan evidently derives from Sanskrit Aśvakan, or the Assakenoi of Arrian, which was the name used for ancient inhabitants of the Hindu Kush. Aśvakan literally means "horsemen", "horse breeders", or "cavalrymen" (from aśva or aspa, the Sanskrit and Avestan words for "horse"). This view was propounded by scholars like Christian Lassen, J. W. McCrindle, M. V. de Saint Martin, and É. Reclus,

The Indian epic Mahabharata speaks about Kambojas among the finest horsemen, and ancient Pali texts describe their lands as the land of horses. Kambojas spoke Avestan language and followed Zoroastrianism. Some scholars believe Zoroastrianism originated in the land of Kambojas.

Afghanistan

The last part of the name -stān is a Persian suffix for "place of", the Pashto translation of which is  prominent in many languages of Asia. The name Afghanistan is mentioned in writing by the 16th century Mughal rulers Babur and his descendants, referring to the territory between Khorasan, Kabulistan, and the Indus River, which was inhabited by tribes of Afghans. 

The name "Afghanistan" is also mentioned many times in the writings of the 16th-century historian Ferishta:

Regarding the modern state of Afghanistan, the Encyclopædia Of Islam explains:

The coined term of Afghanistan came into place in 1855, during the reign of Dost Mohammad Khan while he was forging his campaigns to re-unite Afghanistan following its 70 year civil war with the Barakzai-Durrani feud following the execution of Wazir Fateh Khan Barakzai.

Historical and obsolete suggestions
There are a number of other hypotheses suggested for the name historically, all of them obsolete.
 The "Maḫzan-e Afġān" by Nimat Allah al-Harawi, written in 1612 at the Mughal court, traces the name Afghan to an eponymous ancestor, an Afghana, identified as a grandson of Saul.  Afghana was supposedly a son of Irmia (Jeremia), who was in turn a son of Saul (Talut).  Afghana was orphaned at a young age, and brought up by David. When Solomon became king, Afghana was promoted as the commander-in-chief of the army. Neither Afghana nor Jeremia son of Saul figure in the Hebrew Bible. Some four centuries after Afghana, in the 6th century BCE, Bakhtunnasar, or Nebuchadnezzar, the king of Babil, attacked the Kingdom of Judah and exiled the descendants of Afghana, some of whom went to the mountains of Ghor in present-day Afghanistan and some to the neighborhood of Mecca in Arabia. Until the time of Muhammad, the deported Children of Israel of the east continually increased in number in the countries around Ghor which included Kabul, Kandahar and Ghazni and made wars with the infidels around them. Khalid bin Walid is said to belong to the tribe of descendants of Afghana in the neighborhood of Mecca, although actually he was from the tribe of Quraysh. After conversion to Islam, Khalid invited his kinsmen, the Children of Israel of Ghor, to Islam. A deputation led by Qais proceeded to Medina to meet Muhammad and embraced Islam. Muhammad lavished blessings on them, and gave the name Abdur Rashid to Qais, who returned to Ghor successfully to propagate Islam. Qais had three sons, Sarban, Bettan and Ghourghusht, who are progenitors of the various Pashtun tribes.
 Samuel G. Benjamin (1887) derived the name Afghan from a term for 'wailing', which the Persians are said to have contemptuously used for their plaintive eastern neighbors.
 H. W. Bellew, in his 1891 An Inquiry into the Ethnography of Afghanistan, believes that the name Afghan comes from Alban which derives from the Latin term albus, meaning "white", or "mountain", as mountains are often white-capped with snow (cf. Alps); used by Armenians as Alvan or Alwan, which refers to mountaineers, and in the case of transliterated Armenian characters, would be pronounced as Aghvan or Aghwan. To the Persians, this would further be altered to Aoghan, Avghan, and Afghan as a reference to the eastern highlanders or "mountaineers".
 Michanovsky suggests the name Afghan derives from Sanskrit Avagana, which in turn derives from the ancient Sumerian word for Badakhshan - Ab-bar-Gan, or "high country".
 Scholars such as Yu Gankovsky have attempted to link "Afghan" to an Uzbek word "Avagan" said to mean "original".

See also
 List of country name etymologies
 Name of Afghanistan

References

Further reading
 Biases and Controversies around the word "Afghan" – Nasimfekrat.com

 

History of Afghanistan
Ethnonyms
Country name etymology
Pashto words and phrases
English words

lv:Afganistānas nosaukums
sq:Afganët